Manuel Nazareth da Costa e Sousa (born 18 September 1962), known as Necas, is an Angolan retired basketball player and current coach. Playing as a shooting guard, Necas was best known for his sharp three-point shooting thus becoming one of the best in this category, along with Víctor de Carvalho.

He served as assistant coach of Angolan side Interclube. On 5 July 2021, Necas took over as head coach of Primeiro de Agosto. He won the 2020–21 Taça de Angola with Primeiro, beating his former team Interclube in the final.

Awards and accomplishments

Coaching career
Primeiro de Agosto
Taça de Angola: (2021)

References

External links
 
 FIBA.com Profile
 Basketball-Reference Profile

1962 births
Living people
Angolan basketball coaches
Angolan men's basketball players
1990 FIBA World Championship players
Basketball players at the 1992 Summer Olympics
C.D. Primeiro de Agosto men's basketball players
Olympic basketball players of Angola
Basketball players from Luanda
Shooting guards
1986 FIBA World Championship players